The 2017 Erovnuli Liga (formerly known as Umaglesi Liga) was the 29th season of top-tier football in Georgia. Samtredia are the defending champions. The season began on 4 March 2017 and ended on 26 November 2017.

Teams and stadia
Zugdidi and Tskhinvali were directly relegated at the end of the previous season; Sioni Bolnisi and Guria Lanchkhuti were also relegated after losing play-off ties. Because the league contracted from 14 to 10 teams for this season, there was no promotion from the 2016 Pirveli Liga.

Source: Scoresway

League table

Results
Each team will play the other nine teams home-and-away twice, for a total of 36 games each.

First half of season

Second half of season

Relegation play-offs

5–5 on aggregate. Sioni Bolnisi won 4–2 on penalties.

Kolhketi Poti won 4–3 on aggregate.

Top goalscorers

References

External links
  
Georgian Football Federation

Erovnuli Liga seasons
1
Georgia
Georgia